Golubkovo is a rural locality (a village) in Spasskoye Rural Settlement, Vologodsky District, Vologda Oblast, Russia. The population was 20 as of 2002.

Geography 
Golubkovo is located 12 km south of Vologda (the district's administrative centre) by road. Spasskoye is the nearest rural locality.

References 

Rural localities in Vologodsky District